Hills is a surname. Like the related surname Hill (surname), Hills refers to someone living 'at the hill'. Notable people and characters with the name include:

People
 Adam Hills (born 1970), Australian comedian
 Adam Hills (politician) (1880–1941), Labour Party politician in England
 Alex Hills (born 1974), English composer
 Anna Althea Hills (1882–1930), American painter
 Anne Hills (born 1953), American folk singer-songwriter
 Arnold Hills (1857–1927), English businessman, sportsman, philanthropist and promoter of vegetarianism
 Arthur Hills (1930–2021), American golf course designer
 Barry Hills (born 1937), British thoroughbred horse trainer
 Ben Hills (1942–2018), Australian freelance journalist and author
 Beverly Hills (actress) (born 1966), British actress
 Brian Hills (born 1959), Canadian ice hockey coach and former player
 Chester Hills (1798–1854), American architect and author
 Christopher Hills (1926–1997), English-born author, philosopher, and scientist
 Dene Hills (born 1970), Australian cricketer
 Denis Hills (1913–2004), British teacher, traveller, author and adventurer
 Edward F. Hills (1912–1981), American Presbyterian scholar
 Edwin Sherbon Hills (1906–1986), Australian geologist
 Ernie Hills (born 1930), New-Zealand born rugby union player who represented Australia
 Floyd Nathaniel Hills (born 1982), American record producer, professionally known as Danja
 George Hills (1816–1895), Canadian Anglican bishop
 George Hills (historian) (1918–2002), British journalist and historian
 George Edwin Hills (1905–1978), English-born painter, contractor and political figure in British Columbia
 Gerald Hills, American politician and educator
 Gillian Hills (born 1944), British actress and singer
 Graham John Hills (1926–2014), British scientist and educator
 Harry Hills (1886–?), English cricketer
 Hilda Hills (1913–2003), Australian cricketer
 Jack G. Hills, American astronomer
 Joe Hills (1897–1969), English cricketer and umpire
 Joe Hills (American football) (born 1987), American football player
 John Hills (disambiguation), multiple people
 Johnny Hills (born 1934), English professional footballer
 Julia Hills (born 1957), British actress
 Laura Coombs Hills (1859–1952), American painter
 Lawrence D. Hills (1911–1990), British horticulturalist, journalist, and writer
 Lee Hills (footballer) (born 1990), English footballer
 Lee Hills (journalist) (1906–2000), editor and publisher 
 Michael Hills (disambiguation), multiple people
 Pat Hills (1917–1992), Australian politician
 Paul Hills (born 1972), former Australian rules footballer
 Peter Youngblood Hills (born 1978), Anglo-American actor
 Richard Hills (disambiguation), multiple people
 Robert Hills (1769–1844), English painter and etcher
 Roderick M. Hills (1931–2014), former Chairman of the U.S. Securities and Exchange Commission
 Stephen Hills (1771–1844), American architect 
 Tad Hills (born 1963), American children's book author and illustrator
 Thomas Hills (1796–1866), English cricketer 
 Tony Hills (American football) (born 1984), American football player
 Wendy Hills (born 1954), Australian former cricketer
 Wes Hills (born 1995), American football player

Characters
 Heather Hills, a character in Jeff Kinney's book series, Diary of a Wimpy Kid
 Ted Hills, a fictional character from the BBC soap opera EastEnders
 Tony Hills, a fictional character from the BBC soap opera EastEnders

See also
 Hill (surname)
 Hills (disambiguation)

References 

English-language surnames